Diploblechnum fraseri, synonym Blechnum fraseri, known commonly as the miniature tree fern and by its Māori name maukurangi, is a species of fern in the family Blechnaceae native to New Zealand, Malesia and Taiwan.

Distribution 
Diploblechnum fraseri is found in New Zealand, Malesia and Taiwan.

New Zealand 
Its North Island range spans from Te Paki in Northland to near Mokau in Waikato. Its South Island range is limited to north-west Nelson.

References 

Blechnaceae